Daniels Creek is a  long 3rd order tributary to the Cape Fear River in Harnett County, North Carolina.

Variant names
According to the Geographic Names Information System, it has also been known historically as:  
McPhersons Creek

Course
Daniels Creek rises in a pond about 0.1 miles north of Seminole, North Carolina and then flows northeasterly to join the Cape Fear River about 3 miles southwest of Cokesbury, North Carolina.

Watershed
Daniels Creek drains  of area, receives about 47.3 in/year of precipitation, has a wetness index of 396.45 and is about 59% forested.

See also
List of rivers of North Carolina

References

Rivers of North Carolina
Rivers of Harnett County, North Carolina
Tributaries of the Cape Fear River